Gdynia Wielki Kack railway station is a railway station serving the city of Gdynia, in the Pomeranian Voivodeship, Poland. The station opened in 1921 and is located on the Nowa Wieś Wielka–Gdynia Port railway. The train services are operated by SKM Tricity.

Modernisation
The station was modernised in 2015 as part of the works for the Pomorska Kolej Metropolitalna.

Train services
The station is served by the following service(s):

Pomorska Kolej Metropolitalna services (R) Gdansk - Gdansk Airport - Gdansk Osowa - Gdynia
Regional services (R) Koscierzyna - Zukowo - Gdansk Osowa - Gdynia

References

 This article is based upon a translation of the Polish language version as of July 2016.

External links

Wielki Kack
Railway stations in Poland opened in 1921